Justo Lamas is an Argentine singer. He was born in Buenos Aires and tours the United States singing for middle- and high-school Spanish students. Most notable is his song Siempre Por Siempre." He has released six albums: Vivir, Justo Para Ti, Un Día Especial, Creo En Ti, Justo En Vivo, Vida Nueva, and, most recently, Sueños. Lamas was recently voted one of the "200 Hottest Argentine Singers."

Lamas sings about peace, love and happiness. He sings some songs by Argentine singer and composer Sergio Denis. Justo Lamas received the National Culture through the Arts Award from the New York Association of Foreign Language Teachers (NYSFALT).

References

External links
 Justo Lamas website
 Song lyrics

21st-century Argentine male singers
Year of birth missing (living people)
Living people
Singers from Buenos Aires